William Thomas ( – 26 December 1860) was an Anglo-Canadian architect.  His son William Tutin Thomas (1829–1892) was also an architect, working mostly in Montreal, Quebec.

Life 
Thomas was born in Suffolk, England. He was apprenticed to a local builder after his family moved to Gloucestershire. His two older brothers became master glaziers and younger brother was the sculptor John Thomas, apprenticed under Sir Charles Barry and A.W. Pugin (born 1813).

On completion of his apprenticeship, William moved to Birmingham to work for Richard Tutin, a builder and surveyor. He became a member of the Tutin family by marrying Martha, a member of the Tutin family. During this time he revised his title to architect, however, a depression in the city forced the closure of the firm and he moved to Leamington.

Thomas began his own practice at Leamington Spa in 1831 where he designed many buildings, but in 1837 went bankrupt. In 1843, during a depression in the British building industry, he emigrated to Canada with his wife and 10 children to Toronto, where his career flourished. He designed some of the finest Decorated Gothic Revival architecture in Ontario.

Between 1845 and 1850, Thomas worked extensively with the trio of Scottish sculptors John Cochrane and Brothers. They were responsible for work such as the interior decorations of St. Paul's Cathedral, stone and stucco ornamentation inside St. Michael's Cathedral Basilica and stone carving, including the coat of arms in the central gable, at Bishop's Palace, and exterior embellishments on St. Lawrence Hall.

He was also Toronto's city engineer when John George Howard made a trip to England in 1853. He died in Toronto, aged about sixty.  Two of his sons, William Tutin Thomas and Cyrus Pole Thomas, also became architects.

Thomas is sometimes inaccurately credited with the architectural design and the elaborate stone carvings on Victoria Hall in Cobourg, Ontario. In fact, Kivas Tully designed the building and the fine sandstone carvings are the work of master stone carver Charles Thomas Thomas (no relation).

Works

See also 
 List of oldest buildings and structures in Toronto

References

External links 

 Biography at the Dictionary of Canadian Biography Online
 A list of William Thomas' projects at the Biographical Dictionary of Architects in Canada, 1800–1950

1799 births
1860 deaths
Canadian architects
19th-century English architects
Architects from Birmingham, West Midlands
Persons of National Historic Significance (Canada)
Architects from Gloucestershire
British emigrants to Canada
Burials at St. James Cemetery, Toronto